Black Law or Black Laws may refer to:

The Indemnity Ordinance, 1975 in Bangladesh
The Frontier Crimes Regulation in Pakistan (formerly British India)
The 2020 Indian agriculture acts in India
The Native Laws Amendment Act, 1952 of South Africa
The Black Law Wind Farm in Scotland
The Black Law (hill), a mountain in Scotland
The Black Codes (United States)